Kamuli District  is a district in the Eastern Region of Uganda. The town of Kamuli is the site of the district headquarters.

Location
Kamuli District is bordered by Buyende District to the north, Luuka District to the east, Jinja District to the south, and Kayunga District to the west.

Population
In December 1991, the district had a population of about 249,300 according to the national census. In 2002, the census estimated the population at 361,400, with 40.5 percent male and 59.5 percent female. In 2012, the population was estimated at 500,800.

Ethnicity and language
The district is a multi-ethnic and multi-cultural society, with the predominant ethnic group being the Basoga who comprise 76 percent of the population. The Iteso people make up 3.9 percent and the Banyoro and Bagungu together make up 1.8 percent. Other Ugandan ethnicities make up the remainder (18.3 percent). The predominantly language spoken in Kamuli District is Lusoga, with some Luganda and English.

The district is part of the Busoga sub-region, which is coterminous with the Kingdom of Busoga.

Economic activities
Means of earning a livelihood in Kamuli District include:
 Fishing
 Ranching 
 Farming
 Fish farming
 Bee keeping
 Retail trade
 Quarrying

The crops grown include the following:
 Upland rice
 Paddy rice
 Matooke
 Sweet bananas 
 Maize
 Millet
 Soybeans
 Groundnuts
 Oranges
 Mangoes
 Potatoes
 Beans
 Simsim
 Sunflower
 Tomatoes
 Onions
 Coffee
 Cotton
 Sugarcane

Livestock kept includes cattle, goats, sheep, and chicken.

Non-government organizations 
Since 2003, Iowa State University's Center for Sustainable Rural Livelihoods has worked side-by-side with Kamuli District residents to discover and implement sustainable solutions to meeting the community’s most urgent needs. Starting with farmer training, the center has evolved into programming that touches every stage of the life cycle. The Iowa State University-Uganda Program is headquartered in Kamuli.

Uganda Community Farm is a non-profit community agribusiness organisation that equips  participating farmers with farming materials, offers training for growing crops adapted to local conditions, and builds market access for selling their crops. Started in 2013 as a pilot project farming 5 acres, the organisation expanded to several programs. As of 2020, the organisation has trained and supported 500 farmers within the Kamuli and Buyenda districts to grow white sorghum. Uganda Community Farm is headquartered in Kamuli.

Notable people
 Patrick Kimumwe - Ugandan soldier, rebel, and author

See also
Districts of Uganda

References

External links
 Sugar As a Potential Vehicle for Vitamin A Fortification: Experience from Kamuli District in Uganda

 
Busoga
Districts of Uganda
Eastern Region, Uganda
White Nile